Basher may refer to:

People 

 Basher (nickname)
 Basher (surname)
 A person who participates in pejorative bashing

Arts and entertainment 

 Basher Tarr, a character in the 2001 film Ocean's Eleven, portrayed by Don Cheadle
 A skill in the video game Lemmings
 An instrumental track from the album Closer to the Sun by Slightly Stoopid

Other 

 Basher, Missouri, a community in the United States
 Basher Kill, a tributary stream to the Neversink River in the U.S. state of New York

 A type of hat also known as a boater
 A term with multiple meanings for railfans

See also 

 
 Bashir
 Bashert, the Yiddish word for destiny